NS-2664 (LS-193,048) is an anxiolytic drug with a novel chemical structure, developed by the small pharmaceutical company NeuroSearch. It has similar effects to benzodiazepine drugs, but is structurally distinct and so is classed as a nonbenzodiazepine anxiolytic. NS-2664 is a potent but non-selective partial agonist at GABAA receptors, although with little efficacy at the α1 subtype and more at α2 and α3. It has potent anticonvulsant effects in animal studies, but a relatively short duration of action, and produces little sedative effects or physical dependence.

References 

Anxiolytics
3-Furyl compounds
Benzimidazoles
Imidazoles
GABAA receptor positive allosteric modulators